Vanja Vonckx (born 12 February 1973) is a former Belgian racing cyclist. She finished in second place in the Belgian National Road Race Championships in 1999. She also competed in the women's road race at the 2000 Summer Olympics.

References

External links
 

1973 births
Living people
Belgian female cyclists
People from Bonheiden
Olympic cyclists of Belgium
Cyclists at the 2000 Summer Olympics
Cyclists from Antwerp Province